HMJ can refer to:

 Gejia language, spoken in China
 Hiroshima Mathematical Journal
 Ho Mann Jahaan, a Pakistani film
 Khmelnytskyi Airport in Ukraine